Italy competed at the FIS Alpine World Ski Championships 1931 in Mürren, Switzerland, from 19 to 23 February 1931. It was the first edition of the world championships.

Medalists
At this first edition of the world championships, Italy won no medal.

Results
Carlo Barassi was the only Italian athlete to participate in competitions, however, finishing all races in last position.

Men

Women
No Italian woman took part in this first edition of the world championships.

See also
 Italy at the FIS Alpine World Ski Championships
 Italy national alpine ski team

References

External links
 Italian Winter Sports Federation 

Nations at the FIS Alpine World Ski Championships 1931
Alpine World Ski Championships
Italy at the FIS Alpine World Ski Championships